Gilles Müller was the defending champion, but he did not participate in 2015.

Mirza Bašić won the title defeating Ričardas Berankis in the final, 6–4, 3–6, 7–6(7–4).

Seeds

Draw

Finals

Top half

Bottom half

External links
 Main Draw
 Qualifying Draw

Guzzini Challenger - Singles
2015 Singles